OG Maco is the third EP by American hip hop recording artist OG Maco. It was released for free on November 28, 2014, by Quality Control Music and OGG. OG Maco features guest appearances from 2 Chainz, OG Brylan Kerr, JerZ, Migos, and more.

Track listing

Sample credits
"Undefeated" contains a sample of "Près Des Remparts De Séville" performed by Georges Bizet.

References 

2014 EPs
All articles with unsourced statements
Albums produced by Lex Luger
Albums produced by Zaytoven
OG Maco albums
Albums produced by FKi (production team)
Quality Control Music albums